Janno Ronaldo Ilagan Gibbs (born September 16, 1969) is a Filipino singer-songwriter, actor, and comedian in the Philippines. He was a regular host of GMA Network television shows SOP Rules, Nuts Entertainment, Eat Bulaga!, Kakasa Ka Ba Sa Grade 5?, Power of 10, Party Pilipinas and Sunday All Stars.

Early career
Gibbs started out in 1986 as one of the members of the teen variety show That's Entertainment on GMA Network. Gibbs then played some minor film roles for Viva Films. He was co-host of the TV show "Small Brothers"  in 1990. Gibbs is also known as "Late", "Mokong" and "Philippine's King of Soul".

Television career
Gibbs is known for his role in the '90s sitcom Ober Da Bakod and Beh Bote Nga, both with Anjo Yllana. Gibbs also played the character Geron Agular in Codename: Asero which was aired in 2008. In 2001, Gibbs hired as a co-host of the longest-running noontime variety show in the Philippines Eat Bulaga! until 2007 due to his late appearance in the show.

Gibbs has several television shows like Eat Bulaga!, SOP, Party Pilipinas, Sunday All Stars, Nuts Entertainment, Ober Da Bakod and Beh Bote Nga. Gibbs also hosted a show Kakasa Ka Ba Sa Grade 5?, the Filipino version of Are You Smarter than a 5th Grader? from 2007 to 2009.

Gibbs moved to TV5 after being with GMA Network for 30 years. He is one of the hosts of TV5's game and musical variety show Happy Truck ng Bayan. In 2017, Gibbs appeared once again in his former network, GMA Network, through Meant To Be.

Later in the year, he appeared on some shows of ABS-CBN such as The Voice Teens and on the Magpasikat 2017 segment on It's Showtime, as one of the "hurados" along with Director Rory B. Quintos, actress Ina Raymundo, journalist Marc Logan, and Philippines' Diamond Star Maricel Soriano.

Janno returns to Kapamilya Network in 2018 following the returning also of his SOP colleague Regine Velasquez, and his also long time best friend Ogie Alcasid.

Janno moves to Net 25 for his comedy variety show Happy Time, with co hosts fellow comedian Kit Kat & comedian and long time best friend and former dabarkads host and former Parañaque Vice Mayor Anjo Yllana, and also marking their returning duo of Janno-Anjo Team since their last project together was a comedy gag show Nuts Entertainment in 2003 on GMA 7, Happy Time was premiered last August 2020 exclusively aired on NET 25 (an Iglesia Ni Cristo TV Network).

Film career
Janno's first film was Kalabog en Bosyo Strike Again released in 1986 which stars comedy king Dolphy Quizon, and Panchito Alba, then his very 1st drama movie Payaso with Master Showman German "Kuya Germs" Moreno the same year in 1986, followed by his 1st VIVA Films movie, Puto with his co-star former Q.C. Mayor Herbert Bautista, Mia Pratts, Gelli De Belen-Rivera, his real life wife Bing Loyzaga-Gibbs and Panchito Alba the comedy film was released in 1987.  Janno's 1st Regal Entertainment movie was Stupid Cupid a romantic comedy movie was released in 1988.

Janno's following film is the action comedy film Tora Tora, Bang Bang, where he plays a news reporter with co stars Eddie Gutierrez, and also special participation of former DZRH, DWIZ & now DZRJ AM news correspondent anchor & host Rey Langit; it was released in 1990.  Gibbs' first action drama film was Hindi Ka Na Sisikatan ng Araw: Kapag Puno Na ang Salop Part-III, where he co-stars with Fernando Poe Jr.; it was also released in 1990 by FPJ Productions.

Janno released his movie under Viva Films titled Astig with Dennis Padilla in 1993.

Janno's comedy movie Ober Da Bakod Da Movie which stars former Parañaque Vice Mayor Anjo Yllana, Malou De Guzman, Angelu De Leon, stage actor turned comedian Leo Martinez, Donita Rose, Gelli De Belen, Dale Villar, and former beauty queen Michelle Aldana; the comedy movie was directed by TV host, radio host & comedian Ariel Ureta and it was released by Viva Films in 1994.

Janno released his action comedy fantasy movie, Ang Pagbabalik Ni  Pedro Penduko which co stars Donita Rose, Vina Morales, Malou De Guzman, former dancer Rez Cortez, gay comedian Arnel Ignacio, stage actor turned comedian actor Leo Martinez & action star Jun Aristorenas, with special participations of action stars real life cousins Robin Padilla and action star Rudy "Daboy" Fernandez, hip hop recording turned comedian Andrew E., Anjanette Abayari and of course action king Fernando Poe, Jr., this action comedy fantasy movie was released by Viva Family Entertainment (now Viva Films) in 1995.

Janno released his movie under Viva Films titled Si Mokong si Astig at si Gamol together with Andrew E. and Dennis Padilla in 1997.

Janno also released his comedy movie Enteng & Mokong which stars Bossing Vic Sotto, and Maricel Laxa, and was released in 1999 by M Zet Productions & Co Production with MAQ Productions (now Regal Entertainment).

Janno also made a Holy Week Drama TV Movie Special on Eat Bulaga entitled True Love in 2005.

Janno returns again as a role of Pedro Penduko in the action fantasy comedy sequel, "Pedro Penduko Episode 2", with co stars comedian Jeffrey Tam, action star Ace Espinosa, LJ Moreno, former child star Goyong, his real life daughter Alyssa Gibbs and action kung fu star Ramon Zamora, and also with special participation of Christopher De Leon, action star Cesar Montano, singer turned comedian Ogie Alcasid, and Joyce Jimenez; this action fantasy comedy movie was released by Viva Films in 2000.

His most notable recent comedy film was Weyt a Minute, Kapeng Mainit was released in 2001 with Blakdyak and released also by VIVA Films in 2001, and 'Juan & Ted Wanted with Bayani Agbayani, Carla Guevarra, Anne Curtis-Eussaff, comedian Romy "Ragul" Pastrana, and comedian Ching Arellano; it was released also in 2001.

Janno returns to a big screen in a comedy movie with co-stars hip hop superstar Andrew E., Astig Comedian Dennis Padilla in Sanggano, Sanggago't Sanggwapo with the special participation of Manoy Eddie Garcia who also Manoys last movie before his passing in 2019, the wackiest sexy comedy movie was recently shown last September 2019 and release by VIVA Films.  Janno's recent wackiest comedy movie was Pakboys Takusa with Andrew E., Dennis Padilla and his new character singer turned comedian Jerald Napoles, and was released by VIVA Films for the 2020 Metro Manila Film Festival Digital Stream Edition in December 2020.

Music career
Gibbs released a Vicor Music single called "Miss" in 1988 which became a radio hit. His second album entitled "Ipagpatawad" received a Gold and Platinum Award. One of the singles from that album with the same title won the 1991 Awit Award for Best Revival. Poly Cosmic Records released his third and fourth album. The third, entitled "Bulong" contains two of his original compositions. It also contained a revival entitled "Binibini" and the much loved "I Believe in Dreams". His fourth album "Another Chance", carries the hit song "Pinakamagandang Babae" which he himself composed, plus the moving love song "Another Chance". His album "Sa ‘Yo" was again released through Viva Records where it had received a Gold Record Award.In 2001,Viva Records released an all revival album Divas & I which contains duet with the divas. In 2002, Viva Records released a live album called Janno Live Viva's and I. In 2004, Gibbs was now also a recording artist of GMA Records when he released his album entitled "Seven", as it is also his seventh album. Viva Records had a compilation album called "Janno Silver Series" which contained duets with Pops Fernandez, Jaya, Regine Velasquez, Rachel Alejandro and Ogie Alcasid. In 2007, Gibbs created an album called "Little Boy" which contained seven of his original composition. In 2008, Gibbs created a new album entitled "Orig" where 11 songs are composed and produced by himself. In 2010, Gibbs created another compilation album called "The Janno Gibbs Anthology" in which 18 of the songs are his compositions. In 2015, Gibbs created another album called "Novela" which contains the telenovela theme songs of GMA. In 2016, Gibbs created a single for his birthday titled "Get It On". In 2017, Gibbs records and created his latest single under GMA Records titled "My Jagiya" also a theme song of GMA's Telenovela Series "My Korean Jagiya". In 2017, Gibbs releases his new album this year very soon under GMA Records. In January 2018, Gibbs released a new digital album called Nagbabalik which includes his single Get It On, Oh Girl featuring Andrew E. and many more under GMA Records available on Spotify and other digital stores nationwide. In 2021, Gibbs releases his two new singles under Viva Records titled Pangmalakasan and Pag-Ibig Kong Tunay. In 2022, Gibbs releases his single under Viva Records on his birthday titled Future Lover.

His most notable songs are, among others:

Fallin'
Binibini
Pinakamagandang Lalaki
If I'm Not in Love
Heart of Mine
I Believe in Dreams
Ipagpatawad Mo
Ikaw Lamang (with Jaya)
Kung Mamahalin Mo Lang Ako
Sana Dalawa Ang Puso Ko
Moments Of Love
Muli
Walang Kadala-Dala
Umibig Muli
Sa'yo
Sa Lahat Ng Aming Inibig (with Ogie Alcasid)
If I Sing You A Love Song
Only Me and You
I Will Always Stay in Love
Iba Ka (with Andrew E.)
Batang-Bata Ka Pa (with Alyssa Gibbs)
For Love of You
Di Ko Man Lang Alam
Soon
I'll Take Care of You
I Will Be
Lalake Lang Ako
Paraiso Ko'y Ikaw
Haven't Stopped Loving You
Lupin
Asero
Gagambino
Pinakamagandang Babae
Ikaw, Ako at Siya duet with Jaya and Julie Anne San Jose/Jonalyn Viray
Feeling JKL
Get It On
Oh Girl
Maghihintay Sa Iyo
Nagbabalik
My Jagiya
Walang Kupas
Pangmalakasan
Pag-Ibig Kong Tunay
Future Lover

Personal life
He is the son of veteran actor Ronaldo Valdez and Maria Fe Gibbs. He is married to actress Bing Loyzaga since 1990. Together they had 2 daughters named Alyssa and Gabby.

Discography
Janno (Viva Records, 1988)
Ipagpatawad (Sunshine Records "now Vicor Music Corp.", 1990)
Bulong (Cosmic Records "now PolyEast Records, 1992)
Another Chance (PolyCosmic Records "now PolyEast Records", 1996)
Sa 'Yo (Viva Records, 1999)
Divas & I (Viva Records, 2001)
Janno Live Viva's & I (Viva Records, 2002)
Seven (GMA Music, 2004)
Seven Special Edition (GMA Music, 2005)
Little Boy (GMA Music, 2007)
ORIG (GMA Music, 2009)
Novela (GMA Music, 2015)
Nagbabalik (GMA Music, 2018)

Compilation albums
Janno Gibbs 40th Anniversary Collection (Vicor Music, 2004)
Janno Silver Series (Viva Records, 2006)
The Janno Gibbs Anthology (GMA Music, 2010)

SinglesFallin (Full House Theme Song)Ikaw Lamang – duet with Jaya (Original by Zsa Zsa Padilla and covered by Piolo Pascual for the theme song of ABS-CBN primetime drama Sa Piling Mo)Kung Mamahalin Mo Lang AkoKung Tayo'y Magkakalayo (Original by Rey Valera)Umagang Kay Ganda (Original by Ray Ann Fuentes Feat. Tillie Moreno)Sana Dalawa Ang Puso Ko (Original by Bodjie Dasig)Kapantay  Ay Langit duet with the cover singer Asia's Queen Of Songs Pilita Corrales)Heart of Mine (Original by Boz Scaggs)Ipagpatawad Mo (Original by VST and Co., now covered by Mayonnaise)Together, Forever (Theme song of Forever)Sa Iyong Mundo (Theme song of Kambal Sirena)Ikaw, Ako at Siya – duet with Jaya & Julie Anne San Jose (theme song of Ang Dalawang Mrs. Real)Pari 'Koy (Theme song of Pari 'Koy)Weyt a Minit, Kapeng Mainit – with Blakdyak† (theme song of Weyt a Minit, Kapeng Mainit) Get It On (released on September 16, 2016, by GMA Records)My Jagiya – duet with Denise Barbacena/Manilyn Reynes (theme song of My Korean Jagiya)Oh Girl – duet with Andrew E. (released on November 8, 2017, on all digital stores like Spotify and iTunes by GMA Records)Feeling JKL (released on October 10, 2018, on all digital stores like Spotify and iTunes by Star Music)Walang Kupas (released on July 19, 2019, on all digital stores like Spotify and iTunes by Viva Records)Pangmalakasan (released on May 7, 2021, on all digital stores like Spotify and Apple Music by Viva Records)Pag-Ibig Kong Tunay (released on September 3, 2021, on all digital stores like Spotify and Apple Music by Viva Records)Future Lover'' (released on September 16, 2022, on all digital stores like Spotify and Apple Music by Viva Records)

Filmography

Film

Television series
Teen Pan Alley (ABS-CBN) (1986–1988)
That's Entertainment (GMA Network, (1986)
Lovingly Yours (GMA Network)
Spotlight (GMA Network)
GMA Telesine Specials (GMA Network)
GMA Love Stories (GMA Network)
Maalaala Mo Kaya: Sweater (ABS-CBN, 1991)
Love Notes (ABC, now TV5)
Alabang Girls The Comedy Series (ABC, now TV5)
Ober Da Bakod (GMA Network, 1992–1997)
Small Brothers – Host (ABS-CBN)
Maalaala Mo Kaya: Kuwerdas (ABS-CBN, 1995)
ASAP Natin ‘To – Host (ABS-CBN, 1996; 2017–2018)
Gillage People (GMA Network)
Manoy & Mokong (GMA Network, 1997–1998)
Young Love, Sweet Love (RPN, now CNN Philippines)
GMA Supershow (GMA Network, 1988–1997)
Beh! Bote Nga! (GMA Network, 1999–2003)
Magpakailanman: The Ricky Reyes Story (GMA Network)
Nuts Entertainment (GMA Network, 2003–2008)
Marinara (GMA Network, 2004–2005)
Lupin – Inspector Clavio Angeles (GMA Network, 2007)
SOP (Sobrang Okey Pare) (GMA Network, 1997–2010)
Eat Bulaga! (GMA Network, 2001–2007)
Eat Bulaga's Holy Week Special (GMA Network, 2002–2006)
Kakasa Ka Ba Sa Grade 5? (GMA Network, 2007–2009)
Codename: Asero – Geron Aguilar/Agent Rock Star (GMA Network, 2008)
Kakasa Ka Ba Sa Grade 5? (Season 2) – Host (GMA Network, 2008–2009)
Power of 10 (GMA Network, 2009)
Party Pilipinas (GMA Network, 2010–2013)
Pilyang Kerubin – San Pedro (GMA Network, 2010)
Protégé: The Battle for the Big Break – Mentor (GMA Network)
Alice Bungisngis and her Wonder Walis – Hilario Asuncion (GMA Network)
Sunday All Stars – Host (GMA Network, 2013–2015)
Pyra: Ang Babaeng Apoy – Aidan (GMA Network)
Paraiso Ko'y Ikaw – Salvador "Badong / Bads" Carriedo (GMA Network, 2014)
My BFF – Christian Garcia (GMA Network, 2014)
Tunay Na Buhay – Himself (GMA Network, 2014)
Happy Truck ng Bayan – Host (TV5, 2015–2016)
Happy Truck HAPPinas – Host (TV5, 2016)
HAPPinas Happy Hour – Host (TV5, 2016)
Meant to Be – Adonis Adlawan (GMA Network, 2017)
FPJ's Ang Probinsyano (ABS-CBN, 2017–2018) – Bruno Moreno (guest character) (November 2017 – January 2018)
Wowowin – Himself (GMA Network, 2020)
Happy Time – Host (NET25, 2020–2021)

Television special
GMA @ 45: The GMA 45th Anniversary TV Special (GMA Network)
That's Entertainment Anniversary Special (GMA Network)
Ryan Cayabyab: The Music Man @ 50 (ABS-CBN)
No. 1 @ 55: The GMA 55th Anniversary TV Special (GMA Network)
Philippine Idol Grand Finals Special (ABC)
SOP Anniversary Special (GMA Network)
Eat Bulaga Silver Special (GMA Network)
Party Pilipinas Anniversary Special (GMA Network)
GMA @ 60: The Heart Of Television TV Special (GMA Network)
Thank You Kapuso 2015: GMA @ 65 TV Special (GMA Network)
The Voice Teens Philippines Grand Finals 2017 (ABS-CBN 2)
It's Showtime 8th Anniversary Magpasikat 2017 Season 8 (ABS-CBN 2)

Awards and nominations

References

External links

Janno Gibbs profile on iGMA.tv (archived)

1969 births
Living people
Filipino male child actors
Filipino male comedians
Filipino male film actors
Filipino male pop singers
Filipino male television actors
20th-century Filipino male actors
20th-century Filipino male singers
Filipino songwriters
Filipino television personalities
ABS-CBN personalities
GMA Network personalities
That's Entertainment (Philippine TV series)
TV5 (Philippine TV network) personalities
Viva Artists Agency
Viva Records (Philippines) artists
GMA Music artists
Star Music artists
21st-century Filipino male actors
21st-century Filipino male singers
Filipino people of American descent
Filipino television variety show hosts
Filipino game show hosts